Grünbergallee is a railway station on the Grünauer Kreuz–Berlin Brandenburg Airport railway in the Treptow-Köpenick district of Berlin.

References

Berlin S-Bahn stations
Railway stations in Treptow-Köpenick
Railway stations in Germany opened in 1962